The 1856 United States presidential election in Florida took place on November 4, 1856, as part of the 1856 United States presidential election. Voters chose three representatives, or electors to the Electoral College, who voted for president and vice president.

Florida voted for the Democratic candidate, James Buchanan, over American Party candidate Millard Fillmore. Buchanan won Florida by a margin of 13.62%.

Republican Party candidate John C. Frémont was not on the ballot in the state.

Results

See also 

 1856 United States House of Representatives election in Florida
 1856 Florida gubernatorial election

References

Florida
1856
1856 Florida elections